Bananabay II (case reference: I ZR125/07), also known as Eis.de, is a 2011 decision of the Federal Court of Justice of Germany (BGH) relating to keyword advertising.

See also
AdWords

References

External links
 German Federal Supreme Court (Bundesgerichtshof), case reference I ZR125/07 of 13 January 2011 (Bananabay II)

German intellectual property law
Online advertising methods
Trademark case law